Baunach Young Pikes is a German professional basketball club, that is based in Baunach. It is the basketball section of the multi-sports club 1. FC Baunach. The team currently plays in the ProA, the German national second division. 

The club has a cooperation agreement with Brose Bamberg of the Basketball Bundesliga, that regularly sends players on loan to the Baunach team.

Season by season

Source: Eurobasket.com

Players

Notable players

References

External links
Official Site 

Basketball teams in Germany